Łobzów  is a village in the administrative district of Gmina Wolbrom, within Olkusz County, Lesser Poland Voivodeship, in southern Poland.

The village has a population of 1,100.

History 

As a result of the Partitions of Poland (1772–95), the Galicia area and Kraków ware attributed to the Habsburg Monarchy. ŁOBZÓW was in the Bezirkshauptmannschaft (powiat?) of Kraków  in Austrian Galicia in 1900.

For more details, see the article Kingdom of Galicia and Lodomeria.

References

Villages in Olkusz County